East 122nd Avenue station is a MAX light rail station in Portland, Oregon. It serves the Blue Line and is currently the 16th stop eastbound on the Eastside MAX branch. The MAX system is owned and operated by TriMet, the major transit agency for the Portland metropolitan area.

The station is located at the intersection of East Burnside Street and NE/SE 122nd Avenue in Portland's Hazelwood neighborhood. This station has staggered side platforms which are located past the cross street in each direction so that trains can pass through the intersection before stopping. The station was renovated from December 2017 to June 2018, with temporary platforms placed opposite the usual platforms.

Bus line connections
This station is served by the following bus line:
73 - 122nd Ave

References

External links

Station information (with eastbound ID number) from TriMet
Station information (with westbound ID number) from TriMet
MAX Light Rail Stations – more general TriMet page
Park & Ride Locations – TriMet page with information on E. 122nd/Menlo Park lot

MAX Light Rail stations
MAX Blue Line
1986 establishments in Oregon
Railway stations in the United States opened in 1986
Railway stations in Portland, Oregon